Hishey Lachungpa (born 10 May 1967 at Phaka, Lachung, North Sikkim district, Sikkim) a politician from Sikkim Democratic Front party is Member of the Parliament of India representing Sikkim in the Rajya Sabha, the upper house of the Indian Parliament for the term from February 2012 to February 2018 and February 2018 to February 2024.

References

1967 births
Living people
Sikkim Democratic Front politicians
Rajya Sabha members from Sikkim
People from Mangan district
Sikkim politicians